The 1997 Axa Life League was the twenty-ninth competing of what was generally known as the Sunday League.  The competition was won for the third time by Warwickshire County Cricket Club.

Standings

Batting averages

Bowling averages

See also
Sunday League

References

AXA
Pro40